A photoelectric flame photometer is an instrument used in inorganic chemical analysis to determine the concentration of certain metal ions, among them sodium, potassium, lithium, and calcium. Group 1 and Group 2 metals are quite sensitive to Flame Photometry due to their low excitation energies.

In principle, it is a controlled flame test with the intensity of the flame color quantified by photoelectric circuitry. The intensity of the colour will depend on the energy that had been absorbed by the atoms that was sufficient to vaporise them. The sample is introduced to the flame at a constant rate. Filters select which colours the photometer detects and exclude the influence of other ions. Before use, the device requires calibration with a series of standard solutions of the ion to be tested.

Flame photometry is crude but inexpensive compared to flame emission spectroscopy or ICP-AES, where the emitted light is analysed with a monochromator. Its status is similar to that of the colorimeter (which uses filters) compared to the spectrophotometer (which uses a monochromator). It also has the range of metals that could be analysed and the limit of detection are also considered

References

Inorganic chemistry